The Finnish national road 25 (Hangonväylä; , Hangöleden) is the main route between the major cities of Hanko and Hyvinkää in southern Finland. It runs from Tulliniemi in Hanko to the Maisala in Mäntsälä, where it continues to Porvoo as the 2nd class main road 55. Together with the aforementioned road, it forms the Helsinki Metropolitan Circuit and is often referred to as the outer beltway of the Greater Helsinki or also known as the Ring V.

Route 

The road passes through the following municipalities, localities in brackets:
Hanko
Raseborg (Ekenäs and Karis)
Lohja (Virkkala, Lohja and Muijala)
Vihti (Nummela, Ojakkala and Otalampi)
Nurmijärvi (Röykkä, Rajamäki and Herunen)
Hyvinkää
Mäntsälä (Hirvihaara and Mäntsälä)

External links

Finnish national road 25 at the Finnish Road Administration.

Roads in Finland